Timothy Webber is a Canadian television, film, and stage actor best known for his performance as Djordje in the film My Father's Angel, for which he was a Best Supporting Actor nominee at the 21st Genie Awards.

Career
Webber's television roles have included Willie in War Brides, Cece Cooper in Arctic Air, Jerome Robinsky in Men in Trees, Moon in Cedar Cove, Harris Miller in North of 60, Desmond Cage in Cold Squad, Dutch in Black Harbour and The Apprentice in Once Upon a Time. On stage, his noted roles have included Slater in the debut production of Kent Stetson's Warm Wind in China. He was also the voice for the laser pre-show in select IMAX theaters in Canada before certain movies were shown. He is a two-time Gemini Award nominee for Best Supporting Actor in a Drama Series, garnering nominations at the 11th Gemini Awards for North of 60 and at the 14th Gemini Awards for Black Harbour, and was nominated for Best Guest Actor in a Drama Series in 1999 for Cold Squad.

Personal life
A graduate of Dalhousie University, Webber has spent much of his career as an actor living and working in British Columbia.

Filmography

Film

Television

References

External links

Canadian male film actors
Canadian male television actors
Canadian male voice actors
Canadian male stage actors
Male actors from British Columbia
Place of birth missing (living people)
Year of birth missing (living people)
Dalhousie University alumni
Living people
20th-century Canadian male actors
21st-century Canadian male actors